Scorporo is a partially compensatory, mixed-member majoritarian electoral system, sometimes referred to as a negative vote transfer system (NVT) whereby a portion of members are elected in single-member districts (SMDs) and a portion are elected from a list. It may be fully defined as a parallel voting system which excludes a portion (up to 100%) of the SMD winners' votes in electing the proportional tier, to result in a more proportional outcome. The exclusion of a portion of the SMD winners' votes is what makes scorporo fundamentally different from parallel voting and somewhat closer to mixed member proportional representation, and thereby between the two in terms of proportionality. The system is only known to have been used in Italy and for a portion of the compensatory tier of the National Assembly of Hungary.

Use in Italy
Scorporo was in force for elections to the bicameral Parliament of Italy based on Law 277/1993 from 1993 to 2005. Under this system, members could be elected in two ways:

75% of elected members were elected in single member districts (SMDs) using first-past-the-post voting.
25% of elected members were elected on list basis based on the proportion of the votes received by the party (using the D'Hondt method), with the exclusion of a proportion of any first-placed winner's votes.

The system was subject to the following specific rules for each chamber:

Senate
List seats were calculated at the regional level.
All votes for winning candidates were excluded from the list allocation.
No threshold was applied for list seats.
The SMD vote and the list vote were linked, limiting the use of decoy lists (see below).

Chamber of Deputies
The list seats were calculated at the national level.
The number of SMD winner's votes excluded from the list vote was equal to the second place candidate's vote total +1. This represented the number of votes needed to elect the winner in the SMD.
A 4% threshold was established for parties to qualify for the list seats.
The local vote and list vote were not tied to each other, thereby providing an incentive for decoy lists (see below).

Abuse in the 2001 Italian Chamber of Deputies election

In the 2001 Italian general election, one of the two main coalitions (the House of Freedoms, which opposed the Scorporo system), linked many of their constituency candidates to a decoy list (lista civetta) for the proportional component, under the name Abolizione Scorporo (Abolish Scorporo). This list was not designed to win proportional seats, but only to soak up constituency votes for House of Freedoms, enabling them to win a larger share of the proportional list seats than they would be entitled to if all candidates were linked other House of Freedoms parties. This intentionally undermined the compensatory nature of the electoral system. As a defensive move, the other coalition, The Olive Tree, created their own decoy list under the name Paese Nuovo (New Country).

The decoy lists were extremely successful. Between them, candidates linked to the decoy lists won 360 of the 475 constituency seats, more than half of the total of 630 seats in the Chamber of Deputies. Meanwhile, the decoy lists won a combined total of less than 0.2% of the proportional part of the vote. For the two main coalitions, their vote totals in the proportional component were essentially unaffected by the constituency votes, enabling them to win far more proportional seats than the system was designed for. In the case of Forza Italia (a party within House of Freedoms), the tactic was so successful that it did not have enough candidates in the proportional component, and its list exhausted before it could be awarded all the seats it had won, ultimately missing out on 12 additional seats.

This was facilitated by the fact that this particular scorporo system allowed the single-member constituency vote and the proportional list vote not to be linked. Decoy lists are a common issue in all compensatory and pseudo-compensatory systems, and this was not a unique problem for scorporo.

Abolition
Due to Silvio Berlusconi's opposition to the system, Italy reverted to the majority bonus system in 2005.

In 2018, parallel voting was brought back.

Use in Hungary

The compensatory tier of the National Assembly of Hungary (which follows a type of parallel voting with an additional compensatory systems) is allocated to parties crossing a national 5% threshold. Votes of losing candidates as well as surplus votes of winning candidates are added to the list vote, making it a positive vote transfer system. Surplus votes are calculated by subtracting the result of the second-place candidate plus 1 from the result of the first place candidate, making the system similar to scorporo. However, because there are effectively no votes transferred with a negative value, the system is not subject to the same decoy list tactics as scorporo is. Instead, when decoy lists were mentioned in the context of the Hungarian system, it was in reference to the proliferation of unknown parties with similar names to known parties, fielding decoy lists (and decoy spoiler candidates) allegedly intended to confuse voters.

The former, three-tier system also used positive transfer votes for losing candidates' votes in the first round of single district voting and each party's totals were further augmented by "any wasted" votes from the regional list-tier elections. The system used for local elections does not use list votes, only positive transfer votes of losing candidates.

Use in South Korea

Before the 2020 South Korean legislative election the electoral system was replaced by a new one.

The National Assembly continues to have 300 seats, with 253 constituency seats and 47 proportional representation seats, as in previous elections. However, 30 of the PR seats were assigned on the new compensatory basis, while 17 PR seats continue to use the old parallel voting method.

Like in Italy the two main parties (DP and UFP) founded satellite parties, the Platform Party (DP) and the Future Korea Party (UFP).

See also
Elections in Italy
Additional member system

References 

Semi-proportional electoral systems
Elections in Italy
Mixed electoral systems